Richard Bowchier (28 January 1661; 3 November 1723) was the Archdeacon of Lewes  from 1693 until 1723. He was also known as an antiquarian.

Bouchier was born in Pilton, Devon. He was a Fellow of St John's College, Cambridge. He was incorporated at Oxford in 1683. He was a Prebend and Canon of Chichester Cathedral  and Vicar of Amport.

References

Archdeacons of Lewes
Alumni of St John's College, Cambridge
1723 deaths
1661 births
Clergy from Barnstaple